Ibex is an off-road vehicle, made by Foers Engineering Ltd in Rotherham, South Yorkshire, England. Foers offer the Ibex either ready-built or as a kit to build with donor parts from a Land Rover Defender on a monocoque chassis.

Foers offers the Ibex with a range of different wheelbases and body types.

Among other features, the Ibex can be built or delivered with Foer's patented Vector winch system. A winch is mounted centrally in the vehicle, and the cable runs to fairleads front and rear. This allows the vehicle to pull in either direction, or pull out the cable and secure it both ways, so that the vehicle can pull along the cable like a cable car.

There have been four generations of Ibex, from the Mk 1 in 1988 to the current Ibex F8.

See also
Auverland
Cournil
Ineos Grenadier
JPX Montez
Land Rover Defender
UMM (União Metalo-Mecânica)

References

External links
 official Ibex website
 Some information on the Ibex
 Patent application including diagrams for Foers Vector winch

Off-road vehicles
Vehicles of England